The Proletarian Unity Party is a name which was used by the following political parties:

 Proletarian Unity Party (France)
 Proletarian Unity Party (Italy)

See also
List of political parties by name
Labour Party (disambiguation)